is a professional Nippon Professional Baseball player. He is currently with the Orix Buffaloes.

External links

Japan Baseball Daily

Living people
1977 births
Japanese baseball players
Orix BlueWave players
Orix Buffaloes players
Baseball people from Fukuoka (city)